Hengam-e Jadid (also Romanized as Hengām-e Jadīd, Hangām-e Jadīd, and Hengam Jadid; also known as Bandar-e Hengām, Bandar-e Jadīd, Hangām, Hengām, Hengām-e Now, Henjām, and Hīnām Māshī) is a village in Hengam Rural District, Shahab District, Qeshm County, Hormozgan Province, Iran. At the 2006 census, its population was 400, in 95 families.  The village is located on Hengam Island.

References 

Populated places in Qeshm County